The Vega de Granada is a comarca (county, but with no administrative role) in the province of Granada,  southeastern Spain. According to the 2007 census (INE), the comarca has a population of 500,121 inhabitants, which is over half the overall population of the province.

Municipalities 
 Albolote
 Alfacar
 Alhendín
 Armilla
 Atarfe
 Beas de Granada
 Cájar
 Calicasas
 Cenes de la Vega
 Chauchina
 Churriana de la Vega
 Cijuela
 Cogollos Vega
 Cúllar Vega
 Dílar
 Dúdar
 Fuente Vaqueros
 Las Gabias
 Gójar
 Granada
 Güéjar Sierra
 Güevéjar
 Huétor Santillán
 Huétor Vega
 Jun
 Láchar
 Maracena
 Monachil
 Nívar
 Ogíjares
 Peligros
 Pinos Genil
 Pinos Puente
 Pulianas
 Quéntar
 Santa Fe
 Valderrubio
 Vegas del Genil
 Villa de Otura
 Víznar
 La Zubia

External links 

  Vega de Granada tourism 
 Northeast of the Vega de Granada 

Comarcas of the Province of Granada